SUF may refer to:

Scouts unitaires de France
Socialistisk Ungdomsfront (Socialist Youth Front, Denmark)
Syndikalistiska Ungdomsförbundet (Swedish Anarcho-syndicalist Youth Federation)
 SUF, the IATA code for the Lamezia Terme International Airport in Italy
Souf, a town in Jordan
The lexical root of Sufi is variously traced to صُوف, ṣūf  "wool"
 Svenskt utlandsregistrerat företag, meaning Swedish Foreign Registered Branch/Company
 Selective Unforgeability or Strong Unforgeability, security definitions for digital signatures
 Steven Universe Future, an American animated television series on Cartoon Network that serves as a epilogue to Steven Universe